Dasylepis is a genus of flowering plants belonging to the family Achariaceae.

Its native range is Tropical Africa.

Species:

Dasylepis blackii 
Dasylepis eggelingii 
Dasylepis integra 
Dasylepis racemosa 
Dasylepis seretii 
Dasylepis thomasii

References

Achariaceae
Malpighiales genera